Louis Anthony Carey (born 22 January 1977) is a former professional footballer who played as a central defender, mostly for Bristol City. Carey, who was born in Bristol, was eligible to play for Scotland at international level through his grandparents, and played once for the Scotland U21 team.

Career

Carey is a Bristol City supporter and came up through the ranks at Bristol City made his City debut in October 1995, and was a regular in the first team both as a right back and centre back for 9 seasons, and was part of the side which won promotion to the Championship in 1997/1998. He signed a four-year deal in July 2000. He was part of the side that won the 2003 Football League Trophy Final.

Carey spent 6 months at Coventry City under Peter Reid and was in and out of the first team, playing 27 games in all competitions, before then Bristol City manager Brian Tinnion signed him back after his contract was cancelled.

On 4 August 2012, Carey was given a testimonial against local rivals Bristol Rovers, which City won 3–0. Carey made his 500th appearance in all competitions for Bristol City on 15 March 2008.

In July 2013, Carey was three games shy of equalling John Atyeo's appearance record for the club, which he equalled in December 2013. On 29 December 2013, Carey made his 646th appearance for Bristol City to become the club's new record holder.

He left the club at the end of the 2013–14 season.

On 16 January 2015, Carey signed for Western Premier League side Shepton Mallet on a one-year deal.

Louis is now U16 coach at Southampton.

Honours
Individual
PFA Team of the Year: 2003–04 Second Division

References

● Playfair football annuals

External links
Scotland profile at Fitbastats

1977 births
Living people
Footballers from Bristol
English footballers
Scottish footballers
Scotland under-21 international footballers
Association football defenders
Bristol City F.C. players
Coventry City F.C. players
Shepton Mallet F.C. players
English Football League players
English people of Scottish descent
Southampton F.C. non-playing staff